Mario Benítez (born 16 March 1946) is a Uruguayan boxer. He competed in the men's light middleweight event at the 1968 Summer Olympics. At the 1968 Summer Olympics, he defeated Eugenio Boches of Guatemala, before losing to John Baldwin of the United States.

References

1946 births
Living people
Uruguayan male boxers
Olympic boxers of Uruguay
Boxers at the 1968 Summer Olympics
Sportspeople from Salto, Uruguay
Light-middleweight boxers